Maxime Busi (born 14 October 1999) is a Belgian professional footballer who plays as a defender for Ligue 1 club Reims.

Club career
On 5 October 2020, he signed a five-year contract with Italian club Parma. On 3 January 2022, he joined French side Reims on loan for the remainder of the 2021–22 season.

References

Living people
1999 births
Belgian footballers
Footballers from Liège
Association football defenders
Belgium under-21 international footballers
Belgian Pro League players
Serie A players
Ligue 1 players
R. Charleroi S.C. players
Parma Calcio 1913 players
Stade de Reims players
Belgian expatriate footballers
Expatriate footballers in Italy
Expatriate footballers in France
Belgian expatriate sportspeople in Italy
Belgian expatriate sportspeople in France